Gossypium hirsutum, also known as upland cotton or Mexican cotton, is the most widely planted species of cotton in the world. Globally, about 90% of all cotton production is of cultivars derived from this species. In the United States, the world's largest exporter of cotton, it constitutes approximately 95% of all cotton production. It is native to Mexico, the West Indies, northern South America, Central America and possibly tropical Florida.

Archeological evidence from the Tehuacan Valley in Mexico shows the cultivation of this species as long ago as 3,500 BC, although there is as yet no evidence as to exactly where it may have been first domesticated. This is the earliest evidence of cotton cultivation in the Americas found thus far.

Gossypium hirsutum includes a number of varieties or cross-bred cultivars with varying fiber lengths and tolerances to a number of growing conditions. The longer length varieties are called "long staple upland" and the shorter length varieties are referred to as "short staple upland". The long staple varieties are the most widely cultivated in commercial production.

Besides being fibre crops, Gossypium hirsutum and Gossypium herbaceum are the main species used to produce cottonseed oil.

The Zuni people use this plant to make ceremonial garments, and the fuzz is made into cords and used ceremonially.

This species shows extrafloral nectar production.

Synonyms
Gossypium barbadense var. marie-galante (G. Watt) A. Chev., Rev. Int. Bot. Appl Agric. Trop. 18:118. 1938.
Gossypium jamaicense Macfad., Fl. Jamaica 1:73. 1837.
Gossypium lanceolatum Tod., Relaz. cult. coton. 185. 1877.
Gossypium marie-galante G. Watt, Kew Bull. 1927:344. 1927.
Gossypium mexicanum Tod., Ind. sem. panorm. 1867:20, 31. 1868.
Gossypium morrillii O. F. Cook & J. Hubb., J. Washington Acad. Sci. 16:339. 1926.
Gossypium palmeri G. Watt, Wild cult. cotton 204, t. 34. 1907.
Gossypium punctatum Schumach., Beskr. Guin. pl. 309. 1827.
Gossypium purpurascens Poir., Encycl. suppl. 2:369. 1811.
Gossypium religiosum L., Syst. nat. ed. 12, 2:462. 1767.
Gossypium schottii G. Watt, Wild cult. cotton 206. 1907.
Gossypium taitense Parl., Sp. Cotoni 39, t. 6, fig. A. 1866.
Gossypium tridens O. F. Cook & J. Hubb., J. Washington Acad. Sci. 16:547. 1926.

References

External links
Cotton Botany at Cotton Inc.

Cotton
hirsutum
Fiber plants
Flora of Florida
Crops originating from Mexico
Flora of French Polynesia
Flora of Samoa
Flora of Jamaica
Flora of Puerto Rico
Crops originating from the Pacific
Crops originating from South America
Crops originating from the United States
Plants described in 1763
Taxa named by Carl Linnaeus